Zylan Cheatham (born November 17, 1995) is an American professional basketball player for Bayern Munich of the Basketball Bundesliga (BBL) and the EuroLeague. He played college basketball for the San Diego State Aztecs and the Arizona State Sun Devils. He has played in the NBA for the New Orleans Pelicans and the Utah Jazz.

Early life and high school
Cheatham grew up in South Phoenix and initially attended St. Mary's High School. He transferred to South Mountain High School after his freshman year, playing basketball there for two seasons before transferring to Westwind Preparatory Academy. Cheatham transferred back to South Mountain after learning the school did not meet the NCAA's academic standards and retook all of his junior courses simultaneously with his senior courseload in order to graduate on time. Ranked a consensus four star and top 100 recruit, Cheatham committed to San Diego State over offers from Arizona State, New Mexico, Georgetown, Miami and Utah.

College career

San Diego State Aztecs (2015–2017)
Cheatham spent three seasons as a member of the San Diego State Aztecs, redshirting his freshman season after breaking the fifth metatarsal in his left foot. As a redshirt freshman, he averaged 7.9 points and 5.4 rebounds per game. In his redshirt sophomore season, Cheatham averaged 9.1 points and 6.3 rebounds and was named honorable mention All-Mountain West Conference. He was named the Most Outstanding Player of the 2016 Diamond Head Classic after averaging 15.7 points and 9.3 rebounds over four games as the Aztecs won the mid-season tournament. Following the season, Cheatham announced that he would be leaving the program.

Arizona State Sun Devils (2018–2019)
Cheatham transferred to Arizona State University for his final season of NCAA eligibility, citing a desire to play closer to home. He averaged 12.2 points and a Pac-12 Conference-leading 10.3 rebounds per game and was named first-team All-Pac-12 and to the conference's All-Defensive team in his redshirt senior season. He was named Pac-12 player of the week on December 3rd, 2018 following the second triple double in ASU history after recording 14 points, 11 rebounds and 10 assists in an 83–71 win over Texas.

Professional career

New Orleans Pelicans (2019–2020)
Cheatham participated in the NBA G League Elite Camp and worked out for several teams before the 2019 NBA Draft, but was not selected in the draft. He participated in the 2019 NBA Summer League as a member of the New Orleans Pelicans roster, averaging 5.8 points, 6.5 rebounds, and 1.2 blocks in six games. Cheatham signed a two-way contract with the Pelicans on July 24, 2019. Cheatham made his NBA debut on November 16, 2019 in a 109–94 loss against the Miami Heat, scoring two points with three rebounds and an assist in 14 minutes of play.

Iowa Wolves (2021)
Cheatham was acquired by the Oklahoma City Thunder as part of a four-team trade on November 24, 2020 and his two-way contract was converted to a standard NBA contract. However, they waived him on December 2.

On December 18, 2020, Cheatham signed with the Minnesota Timberwolves, but was waived at the conclusion of training camp. He played the season for the Iowa Wolves.

Birmingham Squadron (2021–2022)
On September 24, 2021, Cheatham re-signed with the New Orleans Pelicans. However, he was waived on October 9. On October 25, he signed with the Birmingham Squadron. In 13 games, he averaged 14.2 points, 10.5 rebounds, 2.1 assists, 1.15 steals and 30.6 minutes while shooting 48.7 percent from the field, 42.9 percent from three-point range and 80.6 percent from the foul line.

On December 21, 2021, Cheatham signed a 10-day contract with the Miami Heat using the COVID-related hardship allowance, but was placed in the COVID-19 protocols. Cheatham did not appear in any games for the Heat during his tenure.

On January 3, 2022, Cheatham was re-acquired by the Squadron.

Utah Jazz (2022)
On January 12, 2022, Cheatham signed a 10-day contract with the Utah Jazz. Cheatham appeared in one game for the Jazz. With a couple of days left on his contract, he was assigned to the Jazz's G League affiliate, the Salt Lake City Stars, where he made his debut on January 21 before his contract expired.

Return to Birmingham (2022–2023) 
Cheatham was re-acquired by the Birmingham Squadron on January 24, 2022.

On February 4, Cheatham signed a 10-day hardship contract with the New Orleans Pelicans. However, he didn't play a game for the team. On February 14, Cheatham was reacquired by the Squadron.

Cheatham joined the Milwaukee Bucks for the 2022 NBA Summer League. He re-joined the Squadron for the 2022–23 season. On February 28, 2023, Cheatham was bought out by the Birmingham Squadron.

Bayern Munich (2023–present)
On March 1, 2023, Cheatham signed with Bayern Munich of the Basketball Bundesliga (BBL) and the EuroLeague.

Career statistics

NBA

Regular season

|-
| style="text-align:left;"| 
| style="text-align:left;"| New Orleans
| 4 || 0 || 12.8 || .667 || .000 || – || 2.3 || .8 || .3 || .3 || 3.0
|-
| style="text-align:left;"| 
| style="text-align:left;"| Utah
| 1 || 0 || 5.0 || .000 || .000 || – || .0 || .0 || .0 || .0 || .0
|- class="sortbottom"
| style="text-align:center;" colspan="2"| Career
| 5 || 0 || 11.2 || .500 || .000 || – || 1.8 || .6 || .2 || .2 || 2.4

College

|-
| style="text-align:left;"| 2015–16
| style="text-align:left;"| San Diego State
| 38 || 26 || 20.8 || .528 || .176 || .716 || 5.4 || .9 || .6 || .7 || 7.9
|-
| style="text-align:left;"| 2016–17
| style="text-align:left;"| San Diego State
| 31 || 22 || 23.4 || .519 || .167 || .756 || 6.3 || 1.4 || 1.1 || .6 || 9.1
|-
| style="text-align:left;"| 2018–19
| style="text-align:left;"| Arizona State
| 34 || 34 || 32.4 || .534 || .440 || .618 || 10.3 || 3.2 || .8 || .8 || 12.1
|- class="sortbottom"
| style="text-align:center;" colspan="2"| Career
| 103 || 82 || 25.4 || .528 || .296 || .687 || 7.3 || 1.8 || .8 || .7 || 9.7

References

External links
San Diego State Aztecs bio
Arizona State Sun Devils bio

1995 births
Living people
American men's basketball players
Arizona State Sun Devils men's basketball players
Basketball players from Phoenix, Arizona
Birmingham Squadron players
Erie BayHawks (2019–2021) players
Iowa Wolves players
New Orleans Pelicans players
Salt Lake City Stars players
San Diego State Aztecs men's basketball players
Small forwards
Undrafted National Basketball Association players
Utah Jazz players
United States men's national basketball team players